is a series of war strategy video games by SystemSoft and SystemSoft Alpha in Japan. The series debuted in Japan in 1985 with  exclusively for the NEC PC-98.

Games in the franchise have been released for many platforms including the PC-88, X1, FM-7, MSX, Famicom, Mega Drive, Turbo CD, Game Boy, Game Gear, Super Famicom, Sega Saturn, Dreamcast, Game Boy Advance, Nintendo DS, PlayStation, PlayStation 2, PlayStation Portable, PlayStation 3, PlayStation Vita, PlayStation 4, Windows, Macintosh and other mobile devices.

In April 1993, Famicom Tsūshin (Famitsu) magazine awarded the Daisenryaku series a world record for being ported to the most game consoles. It was ported to seven consoles up until then, including the Game Boy and Mega Drive.

Daisenryaku titles

Personal Computer

Console
{| class="wikitable sortable" style="width:90%" cellpadding="1" border="1"
|-
! Name
! Release Dates
! Platforms
|-
|Daisenryaku
|
|Famicom
|-
|Super Daisenryaku
|
|Mega Drive
|-
|Advanced Daisenryaku
|
|Mega Drive
|-
|Lord of Wars
|
|Turbo CD
|-
|Campaign-ban Daisenryaku II
|
|Turbo CD
|-
|Daisenryaku Expert
|
|Super Famicom
|-
|Barbarossa
|
|Super Famicom
|-
|World Advanced Daisenryaku Kōtetsu no Senpū
|
|Sega Saturn
|-
|World Advanced Daisenryaku Sakusen File
|
|Sega Saturn
|-
|Daisenryaku: Players Spirit
|
|PlayStation
|-
|Iron Storm
|
|Sega Saturn
|-
|Daisenryaku Expert WWII: War in Europe
|
|Super Famicom
|-
|Advanced World War Sennen Teikoku no Kōbō: Last of the Millennium
|
|Sega Saturn
|-
|Daisenryaku Strong Style
|
|Sega Saturn
|-
|Daisenryaku: Master Combat
|
|PlayStation
|-
|Cyber Daisenryaku: Shutsugeki! Harukatai
|
|PlayStation
|-
| Advanced Daisenryaku: Europe no Arashi - Doitsu Dengeki Sakusen |Advanced Daisenryaku Europe no Arashi
|
|Dreamcast
|-
|Advanced Daisenryaku 2001|
|Dreamcast
|-
|Daisenryaku VII / Dai Senryaku VII: Modern Military Tactics|Xbox
PlayStation 2
|Xbox, PlayStation 2
|-
|Daisenryaku 1941: Gyakuten no Taiheiyō|
|PlayStation 2
|-
|Standard Daisenryaku: Dengekisen|
|PlayStation 2
|-
|Standard Daisenryaku: Ushinawareta Shōri|
|PlayStation 2
|-
|Sega Ages Vol. 22 Advanced Daisenryaku Doitsu Dengeki Sakusen|
|PlayStation 2
|-
|Daisenryaku VII Exceed|
|PlayStation 2
|-
|Daisenryaku: Dai Tōa Kōbōshi - Tora Tora Tora Ware Kishuu Ni Seikou Seri|
|PlayStation 2
|-
|Gendai Daisenryaku: Isshoku Sokuhatsu - Gunji Balance Hōkai|
|PlayStation 2
|-
|Daisenryaku: Dai Tōa Kōbōshi - Tora Tora Tora Ware Kishuu Ni Seikou Seri|
|PlayStation 3
|-
|Daisenryaku Perfect: Senjō no Hasha|
|PlayStation 3
|-
|Daisenryaku: Dai Tōa Kōbōshi - Dainijisekaitaisen Boppatsu - Sūjiku Sentai Rengougun Zensekaisen|
|PlayStation 3
|-
|Daisenryaku Exceed II|
|PlayStation 3
|-
|Daisenryaku: Daitoua Kōbōshi 3 - Dai-ni-ji Sekai Taisen Boppatsu!|
|PlayStation 4
|-
|Daisenryaku Perfect 4.0|PlayStation 4
Nintendo Switch
|PlayStation 4, Nintendo Switch
|-
|Gendai Daisenryaku 2020: Shaking World Order! Ambition of the Great Powers and World War|PlayStation 4
Nintendo Switch
|PlayStation 4, Nintendo Switch
|}

Handheld

Mobile Phone

Notable games
 Early titles 
 is the first title in the series, released in November 1985 exclusively for the NEC PC-98. It sold 20,000 copies.

Its successor, Daisenryaku II, modified game systems including the order of unit's move, the defence statistic of cities, indirect fire, warships, and increased a variety of weapons. It sold 50,000 copies. Daisenryaku II was too rich and complex for 8-bit computers, so it was ported to 8-bit computers and gaming consoles as a simplified version titled Super Daisenryaku.Daisenryaku III changed the game system from turn-based strategy to real-time strategy. Daisenryaku titles for the PC-98 had been developed for its built-in BASIC interpreter (N88-BASIC(86), a variant of Microsoft BASIC). Daisenryaku III was very slow, so it was superseded by the pre-compiled distribution of Daisenryaku III '90.

Advanced DaisenryakuAdvanced Daisenryaku is a Mega Drive war game. The game takes place during World War II, and the player can either play as Germany, its allies or its opponents. Multiplayer games are possible, using the modem that was sold for the Sega Mega Drive. 

Daisenryaku Expert WWII: War in Europe

 is a Super Famicom game that takes place during World War II at either the Eastern Front or the Western Front. There is a scenario mode and a campaign mode. By default, the player controls the Third Reich but it can be changed prior to starting the game.

An remake of the game was released in 2006 for the PlayStation 2 as a part of the Sega Ages 2500 series.

The game takes place within the context of World War II. The game is played as either United States, Nazi Germany, or Japan. The outcomes of certain battles result in a change in the path of the war.Electronic Gaming Monthly gave the game an 8 out of 10, praising the ability to view the outcome of each battle in cinematic view and the use of experience points.

Advanced Daisenryaku 2001Advanced Daisenryaku 2001 is a sequel to the World War II strategy game Advanced Daisenryaku: Europe no Arashi - Doitsu Dengeki Sakusen. Advanced Daisenryaku 2001 included some bug fixes and improved graphics.

Dai Senryaku VII: Modern Military TacticsDai Senryaku VII: Modern Military Tactics (known simply as Daisenryaku VII in Japan) is a turn-based tactics videogame for the Microsoft Xbox, which was produced by Kemco and released in 2004 (in the United States). In December 2007 the game was ported to the PlayStation 2 by Valcon Games.

Daisenryaku PortableDaisenryaku Portable is a military turn-based strategy game for the PlayStation Portable published by Genki.

The game takes place on a battlefield of hexagons, upon which the player assembles an army. The aim is to capture cities and factories, in order to increase available resources. The hexagons are rendered in an isometric view with no rotation supported, but the individual attacks are rendered in 3D. The game supports use of the ad hoc wireless mode of the PlayStation Portable for two player multiplayer. The main campaign takes place in the Far East in the twenty-first century. The factions in the game are fictional versions of Japan, USA, Russia, China, South Korea, and North Korea.

Daisenryaku Portable 2Daisenryaku Portable 2 is a military turn-based strategy game for the PlayStation Portable published by Genki. It is a sequel to Daisenryaku Portable, and is set in the Middle East. The player does not control any country, instead controlling the supranational army named "Wild Geese".

Moe moe 2-ji Daisen (ryaku)

This version of the franchise features World War II, but using mecha musume. It includes units from Japan, Germany, America, Britain, and Soviet. The game grid is hexagonal, but characters are in isometric view. The game separated into strategy and adventure mode. Player can play the Pacific Ocean (as Japanese), or the Europe (as German) campaigns. The strategy mode is played in turn-based mode.

The Deluxe version for PlayStation 2 and PSP added a new campaign for allied forces, new characters, and made a few gameplay and visual adjustments.

Daisenryaku Perfect: Senjō no HashaDaisenryaku Perfect: Senjō no Hasha is a Turn-Based military simulation set in the modern era. The player can selects from 22 countries and then becomes either an ally or attacking country. 

Localized titles
While the vast majority of titles in the Daisenryaku series were never released outside of Japan, a few titles were officially localized and others were partially translated by fans.

The series saw its first release in English when Working Designs partnered with SystemSoft Alpha to translate and release Iron Storm for the Sega Saturn in North America in 1996.

A second entry in English was realized when Kemco released Dai Senryaku VII: Modern Military Tactics in North America for the Microsoft Xbox in 2005. The PlayStation 2 port also saw a North American release in 2007.

The mecha musume spinoff of Daisenryaku, Moe moe 2-ji Daisen (ryaku), was translated into Chinese and released by Taiwanese publisher TWTTIME Technology Co., Ltd for the PC in 2008.Daisenryaku Perfect 4.0 saw a worldwide release on Steam in 2018 with a partial English translation done by SystemSoft themselves. Users have criticized the translation calling it "machine translation" and many units' names remain in Japanese.

Fans have partially translated various entries in the series. Advanced Daisenryaku for the Sega Mega Drive, Advanced Daisenryaku 2001 for the Sega Dreamcast, and Daisenryaku VII'' for the PC  all saw translations of various levels released unofficially.

References

Video game franchises
World War II video games
Multiplayer and single-player video games
Turn-based strategy video games
Video games developed in Japan